Main Dolomite is a lithostratigraphic unit in the Alps of Europe. Formation was defined by K.W. Gümbel in 1857.

Middle to Late Triassic sedimentary record in the Alpine realm is characterized by presence of various masses of dolomitic rock formations. In the Northern Calcareous Alps the dolomitic mass of Ladinian - Norian age is divided by the Carnian sandstones and shales of Lunz Formation to the Ladinian - Carnian Wetterstein Dolomite and Norian Main Dolomite. The Main Dolomite reaches higher thickness than underlying dolomites in Alps, therefore it is considered as more important "Main".

Extent 
The formation is found in:
 the Northern Limestone Alps and Southern Limestone Alps of the Limestone Alps, a mountain system of the western and Central Eastern Alps.
 the Apennines in Italy
 the Western Carpathians (Tatric, Fatric, Hronic, Silicic units)

Description 
Main Dolomite is represented by the medium bedded dolomitic layers often with characteristic stromatolitic 
lamination. The formation was deposited in shallow lagoons during the Late Carnian and Early Norian ages of the Late Triassic Epoch in the Triassic Period, during the Mesozoic Era.

Fossil content 
Fossil sauropodomorph tracks, likely made by a plateosaurid, have been reported from the formation.

See also 
 List of dinosaur-bearing rock formations
 List of stratigraphic units with sauropodomorph tracks
 List of stratigraphic units with prosauropod tracks

References 

Geologic formations of Austria
Geologic formations of Germany
Geologic formations of Hungary
Geologic formations of Italy
Geologic formations of Slovakia
Triassic System of Europe
Triassic Austria
Triassic Germany
Carnian Stage
Norian Stage
Dolomite formations
Ichnofossiliferous formations
Geology of the Alps
Apennine Mountains
Limestone Alps
Northern Limestone Alps
Southern Limestone Alps